Kingsborough Houses-Kingsborough Extension, also known as Kingsborough Houses, is a housing project in Brooklyn, New York covering 15.97-acres in Crown Heights, and is bordered by Ralph and Rochester Avenues, and Pacific and Bergen Streets. The project consists of 16, six-story buildings with 1,148 apartment units. It is owned and managed by New York City Housing Authority.

History 
Construction of the Kingsborough Houses finished in 1941 and cost $5,160,000. Upon its completion, 36 employees worked on-site at the development, with nine in the office and remaining 27 employed on the grounds. The development opened with a majority of white residents, but by the late 1950s over two-thirds of residents were African-American.

The Kingsborough Extension was later completed in 1966 and is devoted to housing senior citizens.

Artist and architect 
The cast-stone frieze, Green Pastures: The Walls of Jericho, created was created by Richmond Barthé through the Works Progress Administration (WPA) in 1938. Originally intended for the Harlem River Houses, an African-American public housing development, Barthé created the site-specific work for an amphitheater. The piece consists of scenes from the Old Testament through the eyes of an African-American child, inspired by the play The Green Pastures. After completion, the panels were placed in storage until 1941 when they were installed at the Kingsborough Houses, a majority white development. By 2018, the frieze was in disrepair with NYCHA unable to fund due to capital needs.  As of 2021, the deferred maintenance and repair costs to restore the frieze are estimated to be nearly $1.8 million dollars.

Landscape architect, Gilmore Clarke, designed the development's grounds in a style reminiscent of city parks of the time.

The Kingsborough Extension was designed by architects Morris Ketchum Jr. & Associates.

See also 

 New York City Housing Authority
 List of New York City Housing Authority properties

References 

Public housing in Brooklyn
Crown Heights, Brooklyn